Marcus Chown (born 1959) is a science writer, journalist and broadcaster, currently cosmology consultant for New Scientist magazine.

Biography
He graduated from the Queen Mary University of London in 1980 with a Bachelor of Science in physics (first class). In 1982 he graduated from the California Institute of Technology with a Master of Science in astrophysics. Chown studied under Richard Feynman at the California Institute of Technology.

His books on astronomy and physics are aimed primarily at the popular market, including Quantum Theory Cannot Hurt You, for which he was praised for "expressing opaque concepts with a unique clarity".

Bibliography
Double Planet (with John Gribbin) (novel) Victor Gollancz (1988) 
Reunion (with John Gribbin) (novel) Gollancz (1991) 
Afterglow of Creation: From the fireball to the discovery of cosmic ripples. (1993)
The Ascent of Gravity: The Quest to Understand the Force that explains everything.(2017)
The Magic Furnace: The quest for the origin of atoms. (1999)
The Universe Next Door: Twelve Mind-Blowing Ideas from the Cutting Edge of Science. (2001)
The Never-Ending Days of Being Dead: Dispatches from the Front Line of Science. (2007)
Quantum Theory Cannot Hurt You: A Guide to the Universe. (2007) (published in U.S. as The Quantum Zoo: A Tourist's Guide to the Neverending Universe. (2005))
Felicity Frobisher and the Three-Headed Aldebaran Dust Devil. (2008)
We Need to Talk About Kelvin. (2009) (published in the U.S. as The Matchbox That Ate A Forty-Ton Truck.)
Solar System for iPad. (2010) (a book app)
Solar System: A Visual Exploration of All the Planets, Moons and Other Heavenly Bodies that Orbit Our Sun. (2011)
Tweeting the Universe: Tiny Explanations of Very Big Ideas. (2011) (with Govert Schilling)
What a Wonderful World: One Man's Attempt to Explain the Big Stuff. (2013)

Infinity in the palm of your hand: fifty wonders that reveal an extraordinary universe.[2018]

References

External links
 Marcus Chown's website
 VIDEO: Marcus Chown at the Sydney Writers' Festival on ABC Fora

Science journalists
Living people
1959 births
Alumni of Queen Mary University of London
California Institute of Technology alumni
Physics education in the United Kingdom